Claas Lexion is a series of combine harvesters, manufactured by Claas in Harsewinkel. An American version called Lexion was produced by Claas Omaha Inc. in the United States.

History 
The Lexion was presented in 1995. The first model was the Lexion 480. The Lexion 480 had the same accelerator drum in front of the threshing drum as the Claas Mega, but it came with a bigger threshing drum ( diameter and  width instead of  diameter and  width). Instead of the straw walkers, the Lexion 480 had two separation rotors installed. As a result, the unit ran smoothly and the throughput was much higher than in a conventional straw-walker machine.

From 1999, Claas worked with the US agricultural and construction machinery manufacturer Caterpillar and sold the Lexion combines in North America under the CAT brand. In 2002, Claas took over 50% of the joint venture with Caterpillar and the combine harvester production in the United States. The harvesters produced there were then still marketed as CAT Lexion.

This was again the most powerful combine harvester in the world. In 2010, Claas presented the Lexion 700. In 2013, Claas introduced new emission standards (Tier 4). The Lexion 8900 released in 2019 has a  MAN D42 engine that matches the Fendt Ideal  class 10 combine released in 2020.

Lexion series 

400 series (two separation rotors)
500 series (six straw walkers)
600 series (six straw walkers)
700 series (two separation rotors)
5000 series (five straw walkers)
6000 series (six straw walkers)
7000 series (two separation rotors)
8000 series (two separation rotors)

References

External links 

Claas
 combine harvesters